Ron Lynch  (born June 2, 1940) is a former American football coach. He served as the head coach at Hillsdale College from 1978 to 1979 and at Olivet College from 1980 to 1981, compiling a career college football record of 14–24–1. Lynch played college football at Olivet and coached high school football in Michigan and Texas.

Early life and education
Lynch grew up in Lyon County, Kentucky. He graduated from Olivet College in Olivet, Michigan, where started on the football team for three seasons as a guard and linebacker. Lynch later a master's degree from Eastern Michigan University in 1968.

Coaching career
Lynch was the head football coach at Hillsdale College in Hillsdale, Michigan for two seasons, from 1978 to 1979, compiling a record of 8–14.

Head coaching record

College football

References

1940 births
Living people
American football guards
American football linebackers
Hillsdale Chargers football coaches
Olivet Comets football coaches
Olivet Comets football players
Eastern Michigan University alumni
High school baseball coaches in the United States
High school football coaches in Michigan
High school football coaches in Texas
High school wrestling coaches in the United States
People from Lyon County, Kentucky
Coaches of American football from Kentucky
Players of American football from Kentucky